South Poso Kota is a district in Indonesia. It is located in the Poso Regency of Central Sulawesi. Along with the neighboring districts of Poso Kota and North Poso Kota, this district makes up the capital region of Poso Regency, Poso, covering 56.57 km2 with a population of 47,477 in 2020.

With the population of 10,402 inhabitants and a population density of 415 per km2, South Poso Kota is the 11th most populous and 3rd most densely populated district in Poso Regency. With an area of 25.06 km2, South Poso Kota is one of the smallest districts, with only 0.35% of the total area of Poso Regency.

Administrative division 
As of 2017, South Poso Kota District consists of 5 administrative villages, namely:
 Bukit Bambu
 Kawua
 Lembomawo
 Ranononcu
 Sayo

References

Further reading

Districts of Central Sulawesi